Dittmann is a German surname. Notable people with the surname include:

 Lorenz Dittmann (1928–2018), German art historian
 Marion Dittmann (born 1956), former East-German long track speed skater
 Mireille Dittmann (born 1974), former professional tennis player from Australia
 Sabine Dittmann, Australian-based marine biologist
 Sieghart Dittmann (born 1934), German chess player and epidemiologist
 Wilhelm Dittmann (1874–1954), German Social Democratic politician

Fictional characters
 Arnold Dittmann, fictional character in the 1958 war film Darby's Rangers

German-language surnames